Mizna Waqas, also known as Mizna, is a Pakistani television and theatre actress known for her supporting roles in several acclaimed drama series. She has played the role of Billo in Hum TV's popular series Suno Chanda and its sequel Suno Chanda 2. She is currently playing the role of Haji Nazar's wife in Bakhtawar.

Filmography

Stage

Television

Other appearances

References

External links 
 
 Mizna Waqas on Dramaguru.net

Living people
Pakistani female models
21st-century Pakistani actresses
Pakistani television actresses
Year of birth missing (living people)